The Canute Peterson House is a historic residence in Ephraim, Utah, United States.  In 1978, it was listed on the National Register of Historic Places.

Description
Built in 1869 by Canute Peterson, an early Latter-day Saint leader in Sanpete County, it was designed by architect William H. Folsom.

Richard Nibley, brother of Mormon scholar Hugh Nibley, purchased and restored the home in the 1960s. For a time it was a bed and breakfast. However, in 2014, Cache Valley Bank (directly south) purchased and incorporated the old home into the newly constructed bank building. It is restored and open to the public for tours Monday-Friday 8:30 am – 5:00 pm.

See also

 National Register of Historic Places listings in Sanpete County, Utah

References

External links

 Former official website (via web.archive.org)
 

Houses in Sanpete County, Utah
Houses completed in 1869
Houses on the National Register of Historic Places in Utah
Historic American Buildings Survey in Utah
1869 establishments in Utah Territory
National Register of Historic Places in Sanpete County, Utah